National Highway 166 (NH 166) is a National Highway in India. It runs from Ratnagiri to Solapur via Kolhapur,sangli,miraj, Solapur in Maharashtra. This is a main link connecting Konkan region to South-Western region in Maharashtra. The complete highway is built of rigid pavement with paved shoulders on both sides.

Route
Ratnagiri - Kolhapur - Sangli - Miraj -  Solapur

Junctions

  Terminal near Pali - Ratnagiri

  near Kolhapur

 near Miraj - Sangli

  near Miraj - Sangli

  near Borgaon - Shirdhon

  near Nagaj

  near Sangola

  near Mangalwedha

  near Solapur

References

External links 

 NH 166 on OpenStreetMap

National highways in India